Ellen Gunilla Margareta Pontén (14 June 1929 in Stockholm – 29 June 2019) was a Swedish fashion designer.

Pontén designed clothes with the base colours of grey, white or black. In 1983, she was awarded the Damernas Värld design award Guldknappen, in 2003 she was awarded a Litteris et Artibus She also worked alongside Emilio Pucci in Italy. In 2008, she was awarded the KTH Great Prize.

References

Further reading 

Swedish fashion designers
Swedish women fashion designers
People from Stockholm
1929 births
2019 deaths